Phùng Khoang Church, officially Church of Our Lady of the Rosary is a church in Nam Từ Liêm district, Hanoi, Vietnam. The church was built in 1910 in French neoclassical style.

References

Roman Catholic churches in Hanoi

French colonial architecture in Vietnam
20th-century Roman Catholic church buildings in Vietnam